Alfred Ernest "Cap" McDonald (September 17, 1877 – May 1, 1956) was a Canadian professional ice hockey player. He played with the Montreal Wanderers of the National Hockey Association.

He also played with the Brantford Indians in the Ontario Professional Hockey League and Sydney Millionaires in the Maritime Professional Hockey League.

References

1877 births
1956 deaths
Canadian ice hockey defencemen
Ice hockey people from Ontario
Montreal Wanderers (NHA) players
People from Mattawa, Ontario